Xylocopa caerulea, the blue carpenter bee, is a species of carpenter bee.

Description
The thorax region of these insects are covered with light blue hairs, giving it a striking blue color. The sides of the abdomen and  first abdominal segments are also covered by similar, albeit a finer and thinner coat of blue hairs.

Distribution
This species is widely distributed in Southeast Asia, India and Southern China.

References

Further reading
Ruggiero M. (project leader), Ascher J. et al. (2013). ITIS Bees: World Bee Checklist (version Sep 2009). In: Species 2000 & ITIS Catalogue of Life, 11 March 2013 (Roskov Y., Kunze T., Paglinawan L., Orrell T., Nicolson D., Culham A., Bailly N., Kirk P., Bourgoin T., Baillargeon G., Hernandez F., De Wever A., eds). Digital resource at www.catalogueoflife.org/col/. Species 2000: Reading, UK.
John Ascher, Connal Eardley, Terry Griswold, Gabriel Melo, Andrew Polaszek, Michael Ruggiero, Paul Williams, Ken Walker, and Natapot Warrit.

External links

caerulea
Hymenoptera of Asia
Insects of China
Insects of India
Insects of Laos
Insects of Malaysia
Insects of Thailand
Insects of Vietnam
Insects of Bangladesh
Insects of Myanmar
Insects of Cambodia
Insects of Singapore
Fauna of Southeast Asia
Insects described in 1804